Sir James Alfred Heading (28 January 1884 – 9 April 1969) was an Australian politician.

Politics 
Harding was the Country Party member of the Legislative Assembly of Queensland for Wide Bay from 1947 to 1950 and for Marodian from 1950 to 1960. He was the Minister for Public Works and Local Government and Immigration from 12 August 1957 to 9 June 1960.

References

1884 births
1969 deaths
National Party of Australia members of the Parliament of Queensland
Members of the Queensland Legislative Assembly
Place of birth missing
20th-century Australian politicians